Niloofar Beyzaie (born January 15, 1967, in Tehran) is an Iranian dramaturge, playwright and theatre director who lives in exile in Germany.

Life
Niloofar Beyzaie is the daughter of the Iranian theater and film director Bahram Beyzaie (Bahram Beyzai) and Monir Azam Raminfar who comes from a family of artists. Her uncle Iraj Raminfar is one of the best known costume designers and scenic designers (Theatre and Film) in Iran. Her mother's uncle Abbas Javanmard  was an influential stage directors of the 1940s-70s in Iran.

In 1985, Beyzaie had to leave Iran for political reasons and studied German studies, Theater, Film and Media Studies and Pedagogy at the Johann Wolfgang Goethe University in Frankfurt am Main. After finishing her academic studies (Master of Arts) she founded, in 1994, the theater group "Daritsche". Since then, she is leading this group as stage director, playwright, and light and costume designer.
She is married and has a daughter.

Career
Central themes of her theater work are "woman", "the suffering of individuals among the crowd" and "being a stranger either in the own or in the foreign society". She also puts emphasis on the sociopolitical context of the theater in its contemporary issues.
In addition to her theatrical work she writes articles about the political and social situation, particularly the situation of women in Iran.
She advocates for women's rights and for the rights of gays and lesbians in Iran and is involved in the Iranian art and cultural scene in exile for the rights of religious minorities in Iran, in particular the officially persecuted Baháʼís.
2005, she was awarded the Persian "World Academy of Art, Literature and Media" in Budapest as the best theatre director in exile in the category "the Performing Arts". 
In the same year, her play Daughters of the Sun (Come,dance with me) was performed in Zurich by Maralam Theater under direction of Peter Braschler.

The revival of her play No Man's Land  was performed in German in March 2009 in Karlsruhe  within the framework of the "Cultural Perspectives of Women festival 09".

Her play "Face to Face at the Threshold of the Cold Season" is about two very important women of the Iranian history "Táhirih Qurratu'l- ayn" and "Forough Farrokhzad" had its premiere in October 2011 and was also performed in Toronto, Otawa and Los Angeles 

Her play, In the presence of the Wind, was written by her father in the 1960s and was played in several cities of Europe and Germany from 2015 until October 2016.

Her play, In this Place and at this Time (based on the stories of Mahshid Amirshahi) was played in Frankfurt, Collogne, Berlin, Heidelberg and Zürich from October 2017 to May 2018. ّShe received the audience award for best play for this piece from the Iranian Theater Festival in Heidelberg on February 3, 2018.

Beyzaie was honored for her lifelong theater work on March 2–3, 2018 by "the cultural society of iranian women" in Vancouver. In this context, the play Lady in Mirror, which consists of parts of her plays, was performed by the Theatre group Shahrzad.

She also received the Prize as the best Personality of the year 2018 from the "Foundation of Pasargad Heritage" for the fields of Art and  Culture in March 2018.

In 2018, she also directed the play The lost ones which based on documents, letters, and memoirs of the victims of the 1988 mass executions of dissidents by the Islamic government of Iran in the 80s.

In 2019, she directed the play, When love is a sin. In this play, female poets from different eras who dated back to Iran, Afghanistan and Tajikistan, meet each other and narrate the stories of their lives and suffering as women through their poems which they recite singing.

Selected works

Staging (theatre director)

 Marjan, Mani and a few small problems, 1996
 The Last Game, 1997
 No Man's Land, 1998–99
 A knife in the back ( A Play by Kaveh Esmaili), 1999–2000
 The blue dreams of gray women, 2000–2001
 Three Opinions on a death (based on texts by Mina Assadi), 2001–2002
 The Blind Owl (based on a text by Sadegh Hedayat), 2004–2005
 The Blind Owl (bilingual, along with Tom Peifer), 2005
 foreign as you and I (based on a text by Farhang Kassraei and Maria Piniella), 2006–2007
 The Voice of Silence, 2007–2008
 The blind owl (revival), 2008
 No Man's Land (revival in German language), 2009
 One file, two murders, 2009–2010
 Diaries of newspapers or How the revolution ate its grandchildren (Play reading) 2011
 Face to Face at the Threshold of the Cold Season, 2011-2012
 In the presence of the Wind, 2015-2016 (A Play by Bahram Beyzaie)
 In this Place and at this Time, 2017-2018 (based on Texts von Mahshid Amirshahi)
 The Lost Ones, 2018-2020 (based on Text of Roya Ghiasi, Shokoufeh Motazeri, Ghorbanali Shokri)
 When love is a sin 2019 (Text Composition: Zhaleh Mosaed)

Playwright
 Banu in the mirror city (performed in the same year under direction of Mohsen Hosseini in Frankfurt am Main), 1994
 Marjan, Mani and a few small problems, 1995
 The last game, 1996
 No Man's Land, 1997
 The blue dreams of the gray women, 2000
 Come dance with me (Daughters of the Sun), 2005
 The Voice of Silence, 2006
 One file, two murders, 2009
 Face to Face at the Threshold of the Cold Season, 2011.
 Banu in the mirror (directed by Hessam Anvari, 2018, Vancouver)

Plays (dramaturge) 
 Three Opinions on a death (based on a text by: Mina Assadi), 2001–2002
 The Blind Owl (based on a text by: Sadegh Hedayat), 2004–2005
 foreign as you and I (based on a text by Farhang Kassraei and Maria Piniella), 2006–2007
 The Voice of Silence, 2007–2008
 Diaries of newspapers or How the revolution ate its grandchildren (Play reading) 2011
 In this Place and at this Time, 2017-2018
 The Lost Ones, 2018-2020
 When love is a sin 2019

Awards
 2005:Persian "World Academy of Art, Literature and Media"Budapest:Best Director in the Performing Arts category and 
 2018:ََ Audience Award for her Play "In this Place and at this Time" in the Iranian Theater Festival in Heildelberg 3. February 2018. 
 2018:ََ Tribute to Director and Playwright Ms. Niloofar Beyzaie followed by the musical Lady in the Mirror, 2nd and 3.of March 2018.
2018: Prize as the best Personality of the year 2018 from the "Foundation of Pasargad Heritage" for the fields of Art and Culture in March 2018

See also
 List of Iranian women

References

External links
 The blind owl
 iloofar Beyzaie Tirgan Crew
 Interview at tavaana.org
 Critics in German1
 Critics in German2
 Daritsche theater group- The Culture Portal of the city of Frankfurt
 Beyzaie, Niloofar- The World Academy of Arts, Literature and Media (WAALM)
 Playwright Niloofar Beyzaie on the situation in Iran
 Niloofar Beyzaie IRANIAN STUDIES DIRECTORY
 The Voice of Silence by Diyalog Festival Berlin
 Critics in German3
 _19._Januar_2007 Interview Germany SWR
 No man's land
 Member of artists without frontiers
 the blind owl by harbourfront centre
 Beyzaie at IMDb

Iranian dramatists and playwrights
1967 births
Iranian theatre directors
Iranian exiles
Living people
Iranian human rights activists
Iranian writers
Iranian women writers
Women dramatists and playwrights